Muhammad Zimam Abd Al-Razzaq is an Iraqi politician.

Biography
He was born in 1942 in Suq al-Shuyukh District in al-Muntafiq Brigade (currently Dhi Qar Governorate), and he belongs to al-Saadoun tribe. He held several positions during the rule of the Arab Socialist Baath Party in Iraq, including a member of the Revolutionary Command Council and Governor of Saladin Governorate.

He completed his studies in law and political science. He served as Minister of the Interior from 1995 to May 2001, when he was succeeded by Mahmud Dhiyab.

After the 2003 invasion
He was arrested at his home in Al-Saydiya neighborhood in Baghdad on February 15, 2004, as he was on the list of Iraqis most wanted by the United States.

On 9 April 2009, he was sentenced to life in prison because he was involved in the ethnic cleansing of Kurds and other minorities.

References

External links

1942 births
Living people
People from Dhi Qar Province
Members of the Regional Command of the Arab Socialist Ba'ath Party – Iraq Region
Most-wanted Iraqi playing cards
Iraq War prisoners of war
Iraqi prisoners of war